The women's 5000 metres competition of the athletics events at the 2019 Pan American Games took place the 9 August at the 2019 Pan American Games Athletics Stadium. The defending Pan American Games champion is Juliana Paula dos Santos from Brazil.

Records
Prior to this competition, the existing world and Pan American Games records were as follows:

Schedule

Results
All times shown are in seconds.

Final
The results were as follows

References

Athletics at the 2019 Pan American Games
2019